"Endless" is a song by Swedish trio VAX featuring Tove Styrke. The song was released by A-P Records and Sony Music on 16 February 2018. It was written by Anders Frøen, Brian Lee, Jason Gill, and Jesper Borgen, with production by Gill. "Endless" peaked at number 76 on the Sverigetopplistan singles chart.

Track listing
Digital download
 "Endless" – 3:25

Digital download
 "Endless" (acoustic version) – 3:08

Credits and personnel
Credits are adapted from Tidal.

Anders Frøen – songwriting
Brian Lee – songwriting
Jason Gill – songwriting, production
Jesper Borgen – songwriting, guitar
Kevin Grainger – mixing, mastering

Charts

Release history

References

External links
 

2018 songs
2018 singles
Tove Styrke songs
Songs written by Jesper Borgen
Songs written by Jason Gill (musician)
Songs written by Brian Lee (songwriter)
Sony Music singles
Songs written by Mood Melodies